Sauli Ahvenjärvi is a Finnish politician, representing the Christian Democrats. He was a member of the Parliament of Finland 2011–2015 representing Satakunta.

Career
Ahvenjärvi was elected to the parliament in the 2011 elections. He was a member of the Grand Committee, the Constitutional Law Committee and the Inter-Parliamentary Union, Finnish Group. Previously, he was a member of the Legal Affairs Committee and the Employment and Equality Committee.

Ahvenjärvi changed his electoral district to Pirkanmaa for the 2015 elections, but wasn't re-elected.

References

1957 births
Living people
People from Jämijärvi
Christian Democrats (Finland) politicians
Members of the Parliament of Finland (2011–15)
Tampere University of Technology alumni